Richard Satterlie is a specialist in invertebrate neurobiology, and Frank Hawkins Kenan Distinguished Professor at the University of North Carolina at Wilmington. He has also written four novels and a poetry collection.

Books
 Phoenix (Novel: Historical, American West) Whiskey Creek Press, 2006.  First place winner, Arizona Authors Association annual book awards in the published fiction category.
 Something Bad (Novel: Horror)  Medallion Press, 2007.  Silver Medal winner, Independent Publishers IPPY book awards (2008).
 Rollicking Anthropomorphisms and Other Observations on the Human Condition (Poetry Collection) Whiskey Creek Press, 2008.  Finalist, 2009 EPPIE awards in poetry category (EPICon 2009 annual writing contest)
 Agnes Hahn (Novel: Psychological Suspense) Medallion Press, 2008.
 Imola (Novel:  Psychological Suspense) Medallion Press, September 2009)

References

External links
 http://richardsatterlie.com/bio/satterlie_cv.pdf
 richardsatterlie.com
 http://sols.asu.edu/people/faculty/rsatterlie.php

Living people
Year of birth missing (living people)